George Montaigne (or Mountain; 1569 – 24 October 1628) was an English bishop.

Life
Montaigne was born in 1569 at Cawood, Yorkshire. He was educated at Queens' College, Cambridge, matriculating at Michaelmas 1586, graduating B.A. 1590, M.A. 1593, B.D. 1602, D.D. 1607, and holding a fellowship at Queens' 1592–1611. He was ordained deacon and priest at Peterborough in 1593.

In 1597 he was chaplain to Robert Devereux, 2nd Earl of Essex, on his expedition against Cadiz. He became rector of Great Cressingham in 1602. He was Gresham College Professor of Divinity in 1607, and in 1608 Master of the Savoy and chaplain to James VI and I.

He was Dean of Westminster in 1610. He was appointed Bishop of Lincoln in 1617 and was consecrated on 14 December that year by Archbishop George Abbot, and co-consecrated by the Roman Catholic Archbishop of Split Marco Antonio de Dominis. He was appointed Lord High Almoner in 1619, Bishop of London in 1621 and Bishop of Durham in 1627.

When in 1628 the archbishopric of York fell vacant by the death of Tobias Matthew, Montaigne is said to have secured the nomination by remarking to Charles I, "Hadst thou faith as a grain of mustard seed, thou wouldst say unto this mountain, be removed into that sea [see]". He was duly elected to the archbishopric on 1 July, but died in London on 24 October 1628, and was buried in Cawood Church.

He was one of the Arminian group of bishops who arose in opposition to the general Calvinism that prevailed in the Church of England in the early seventeenth century. One manifestation of his views were prosecutions in his London diocese for the disrespectful wearing of hats in services.

Notes and references

External links

1569 births
1628 deaths
17th-century Anglican archbishops
17th-century Church of England bishops
Alumni of Queens' College, Cambridge
Archbishops of York
Arminian ministers
Arminian writers
Bishops of Durham
Bishops of Lincoln
Bishops of London
Deans of Westminster
Doctors of Divinity
Fellows of Queens' College, Cambridge
Masters of the Savoy
People from Selby District